The Prix Denise-Pelletier is an award by the Government of Quebec that is part of the Prix du Québec, given to individuals for an outstanding career in the performing arts. It is awarded to a creator, performer, stage-craftsman or person who has made a noteworthy contribution in the fields of song, music, classical singing, theatre and dance. It is named in honour of Denise Pelletier.

Winners

References
 Award winners 

Artists from Quebec
Canadian entertainment awards
Canadian performing arts awards
Prix du Québec